("The German song"), WAB 63, is a patriotic song composed by Anton Bruckner in 1892, one year before Helgoland.

History 
The performance on 5 June under the baton of Raoul Mader was a "" (a huge success).

The song was first published in 1911 by Viktor Keldorfer (Universal Edition). The piece, also called , was performed several times till the years 1930.

Lyrics
The song uses lyrics by Erich Fels, pseudonym of Aurelius Polzer:

Music 
The 87-bar long work in D minor, which shows affinities with the patriotic Germanenzug (1863), Sängerbund (1882) and Helgoland (1893), is scored for  choir and brass instruments (4 horns, 3 trumpets, 3 trombones and contrabass-tuba).

Discography 

There are four recordings of Der deutsche Gesang:
 Robert Shewan, Roberts Wesleyan College Chorale and Brass Ensemble, Anton Bruckner - Sacred and Secular Choral Works – LP: Roberts Wesleyan College Records 41 448, 1983. Remastered to CD: High Definition Tape Transfers HDTT.
 Robert Shewan, Roberts Wesleyan College Chorale and Brass Ensemble, Choral Works of Anton Bruckner – CD: Albany TROY 063, 1991
 Timothy Seelig, Turtle Creek Chorale Dallas, Fort Worth Symphony Brass, Times of the Day – CD: Reference Recordings RR-67, 1995
 Thomas Kerbl, Männerchorvereinigung, Blechbläserensemble der Anton Bruckner Privatuniversität Linz, Weltliche Männerchöre – CD: LIVA 054, 2012
Note  Der deutsche Gesang  has been performed at the Brucknerfest 2022 (Brucknerfest 2022 - Krieg und Frieden (29-09-2022)). A recording is available in the Bruckner Archive.

References

Sources 
 Anton Bruckner – Sämtliche Werke, Band XXIII/2:  Weltliche Chorwerke (1843–1893), Musikwissenschaftlicher Verlag der Internationalen Bruckner-Gesellschaft, Angela Pachovsky and Anton Reinthaler (Editor), Vienna, 1989
 Cornelis van Zwol, Anton Bruckner 1824–1896 – Leven en werken, uitg. Thoth, Bussum, Netherlands, 2012. 
 Uwe Harten, Anton Bruckner. Ein Handbuch. , Salzburg, 1996. .

External links 
 
 Der deutsche Gesang / Das deutsche Lied d-moll WAB 63 Critical discography by Hans Roelofs 

Weltliche Chorwerke by Anton Bruckner
1892 compositions
Compositions in D minor
German patriotic songs
Songs about Germany
1892 songs